The following lists events that happened in 2015 in Denmark.

As the Danish constitution require parliamentary elections to occur at least every 4 years (the latest election to the Folketing being conducted in 2011), 2015 will be an election year.

Incumbents
 Monarch – Margrethe II
 Prime Minister – Helle Thorning Schmidt (until 28 June), Lars Løkke Rasmussen

Events
 12 February – Politiken staff photographer Mads Nissen wins the 2014 World Press Photo of the Year.
 14–15 February – 2015 Copenhagen shootings: Two people are killed and several police officers are injured in shootings, the first at a free speech gathering of journalists, artists and cartoonists, the second at the Great Synagogue in Copenhagen.
 15 February – Danish police kill a man near Nørrebro station after an exchange of gunfire. The police believe he was the man responsible for the two previous attacks.
 17–19 March – State visit from His Majesty The King and Her Majesty The Queen of the Netherlands.

Sports

Badminton
 13–18 January – Christinna Pedersen and Kamilla Rytter Juhl win gold in Women's Double at Malaysia Masters.
 15 February – Denmark wins gold at the 2015 European Mixed Team Badminton Championships by defeating England 3–0 in the final.
 38 March  Mathias Boe and Carsten Mogensen wins gold in men's double at tthe 2015 All England Super Series Premier.
 1016 August  Denmark wins one silver medal and one bronze medal at the 2015 BWF World Championships.

Golf
 31 May – Søren Kjeldsen wins Dubai Duty Free Irish Open.
 4 October – Thorbjørn Olesen wins Alfred Dunhill Links Championship.

Other
 1923 August  Denmark wins two gold medals at the 2015 ICF Canoe Sprint World Championships.

Deaths
6 February – Kathrine Windfeld, film director (born 1966)
12 March – Peter Heering, manufacturer of liqueurs (born 1934)
13 March – Inge Eriksen, writer and political activist (born 1935)
14 March – Ib Melchior, film director and screenwriter (born 1917)
21 March – Jørgen Ingmann, musician (born 1925)
2 April – Per Vilhelm Brüel, physicist and engineer (born 1915)
3 May – Holger Hansen, politician (born 1929)

See also
2015 in Danish television

References

 
2010s in Denmark
Years of the 21st century in Denmark
Denmark
Denmark